Prasophyllum montanum, commonly known as the mountain leek orchid, is a species of orchid endemic to eastern Australia. It has a single tubular, green leaf and up to fifty scented, greenish to pinkish flowers. It grows in montane ecosystems at altitudes above .

Description
As with others in the genus, the flowers are inverted so that the labellum is above the column rather than below it. There is a greenish, raised callus in the centre of the labellum. Flowering occurs from December to February.

Taxonomy and naming
Prasophyllum montanum was first formally described in 1991 by Robert Bates and David Jones from a specimen collected at Mount Franklin in the Australian Capital Territory and the description was published in Australian Orchid Research. The specific epithet (montanum) is a Latin word meaning "of mountains" referring the habitat of this species.

Distribution and habitat
The mountain leek orchid grows on dry rocky ridges or in forest, usually above . It is found in montane regions of the Australian Capital Territory and New South Wales south from the Brindabella Range, and in northern Victoria.

References

External links 
 
 

montanum
Flora of New South Wales
Flora of the Australian Capital Territory
Flora of Victoria (Australia)
Endemic orchids of Australia
Plants described in 1991